J.D. Barker, or Jonathan Dylan Barker, (born 1971) is a New York Times and international bestselling American author of suspense thrillers, often incorporating elements of horror, crime, mystery, science fiction, and the supernatural. His debut novel, Forsaken, was a finalist for a Bram Stoker Award in 2014.

Early life and career
Barker was born January 7, 1971, in Lombard, Illinois, and spent the first fourteen years of his life in Crystal Lake, Illinois. At fourteen, Barker's family relocated to Englewood, Florida. He attended Lemon Bay High School and graduated in 1989. He enrolled at the Art Institute of Fort Lauderdale, where he later obtained a degree in business. While in college, a writing assignment found its way into the hands of Paul Gallotta of Circus magazine. Gallotta reached out to Barker and asked him to join the staff of 25th Parallel, where he worked alongside the man who would later become Marilyn Manson. Assignments dropped him into the center of pop culture, and by 1991 Barker had branched out, interviewing celebrities for the likes of Seventeen, TeenBeat, and other national and local publications. In 1992, Barker syndicated a small newspaper column called "Revealed" which centered around the investigation of haunted places and supernatural occurrences. He began work as a ghostwriter and book doctor, helping other authors for publication. Barker cites Stephen King, Dean Koontz, John Saul, and Neil Gaiman among his influences.

Stephen King read portions of Forsaken prior to publication and granted Barker permission to utilize the character of Leland Gaunt of King's Needful Things in the novel. Indie-published in late 2014, the book went on to hit some major milestones - #2 on Audible (Harper Lee with Go Set a Watchman held #1), #44 on Amazon U.S., #2 on Amazon Canada, and #22 on Amazon UK. Forsaken was also nominated for a Bram Stoker Award (Best Debut Novel) and won a handful of others, including a New Apple Medalist Award. After reading Forsaken, Bram Stoker's family reached out to Barker and asked him to co-author a prequel to Dracula utilizing Stoker's original notes and journals, much of which has never been made public.

Barker's indie success drew the attention of traditional agents and publishers, and in early 2016 his debut thriller, The Fourth Monkey, sold in a series of pre-empts and auctions worldwide, with Houghton Mifflin Harcourt set to publish in the U.S. and HarperCollins in the UK. The book has also sold for both film and television. In September 2017, Putnam purchased the publishing rights for Dracul in a five-house auction with additional publishers worldwide, and Paramount Pictures optioned the film rights, with Andy Muschietti set to direct.

In addition to writing his own novels, Barker has collaborated with American author James Patterson. Their first novel together, titled The Coast-to-Coast Murders, debuted at number 2 on the New York Times list on October 11, 2020. Their second collaboration, The Noise, released in August 2021, became an instant New York Times bestseller, and has been optioned by Entertainment One. Their third release, Death of the Black Widow, released in April 2022, and also became an instant New York Times bestseller.

Bibliography

Novels 
 Forsaken  (2014)
 The Fourth Monkey (2017) 
 The Fifth to Die (2018) 
 Dracul with Dacre Stoker (2018) 
 The Sixth Wicked Child (2019) 
 She Has A Broken Thing Where Her Heart Should Be (2020) 
 The Coast-to-Coast Murders with James Patterson (2020) 
 A Caller's Game (2021) 
 The Noise with James Patterson (2021) 
 Death of the Black Widow with James Patterson (2022)

Short stories 

 "Mondays" (1993 - Last Exit Press)
 "Among Us" (1995 - Dark Crossing Magazine)
 "The Sitter" (1996 - Hidden Fears Magazine)
 "Wicked Ways" (1997 - Hidden Fears Magazine)
 "A Caller's Game" (1997 - Hidden Fears Magazine)
 "Room 108" (1998 - Hidden Fears Magazine)
 "Hybrid" (2012 - Among The Shadow Entertainment)
 "Of the Lake" (2016 - Ancient Enemies Anthology - Good Dog Publishing)

Filmography

Television
The Fourth Monkey (CBS)
The Noise (Entertainment One)

Feature films
Dracul (Paramount Pictures)

Awards 

|-
| 2014
| FORSAKEN - Superior Achievement in a First Novel
| Bram Stoker Awards
| 
|-
| 2014
| FORSAKEN - Best Debut Author
| Goodreads
| 
|-
| 2014
| FORSAKEN - Best Horror of 2014
| Goodreads
| 
|-
| 2015
| FORSAKEN - Excellence in Independent Publishing
| Apple E-Book Award
| 
|-
| 2018
| THE FOURTH MONKEY - Best Suspense/Thriller of 2017
| Audie Award
| 
|-
| 2018
| DRACUL - Best Horror of 2018
| Goodreads
| 
|-
| 2019
| THE FIFTH TO DIE - AudioFile 2019
| Earphones Award Winner
| 
|-
| 2019
| DRACUL - Superior Achievement in a Novel
| Bram Stoker Awards
| 
|-
| 2020
| THE SIXTH WICKED CHILD - AudioFile 2020
| Earphones Award Winner
| 
|}

References

Living people
1971 births
American male writers
American horror novelists
People from Englewood, Florida